Robert Franciscus Eenhoorn (born February 9, 1968) is a retired Dutch professional baseball player and manager. He played four seasons of Major League Baseball as a utility infielder for the New York Yankees and California/Anaheim Angels. On September 27, 1997, Eenhoorn became the first Dutch-born player to hit a home run in the Major Leagues since Jack Lelivelt in 1912. The feat was later repeated by Greg Halman and Didi Gregorius. (All other Dutch MLB players to have hit home runs were born elsewhere, mainly in the country's Caribbean territories, most notably the Curaçao natives Andruw Jones and Hensley Meulens.) Eenhoorn played for the Triple-A Norfolk Tides of the New York Mets organization in 1998.

From 2009 to 2014 Eenhoorn served as the technical director for the Netherlands national baseball team.

Since 2014, Eenhoorn has been the general director of the Dutch football club AZ Alkmaar. In March 2015, he hired another former Major Leaguer, Billy Beane, as an advisor.

Early life
Eenhoorn was born in Rotterdam, Netherlands. His father played baseball during World War II as an act of Dutch rebellion against the German occupation. Eenhoorn played association football and baseball growing up and credited his football play with helping his footwork on the baseball diamond.

Dutch baseball career
Eenhoorn played for Neptunus and Haarlem Nicols in the Dutch Honkbal Hoofdklasse, the highest level of professional baseball in the Netherlands, from 1984 through 1990. He won the Ron Fraser Award as the top Dutch prospect in 1984. He was on the Netherlands’ Gold Medal team in the 1987 European Baseball Championship. He also played for his homeland in the 1988 Seoul Olympics and in the 1988 Baseball World Cup, hitting .256 with a .283 on-base percentage, .395 slugging percentage, .887–fielding percentage, and committing 8 errors in 11 games at shortstop.

American baseball career
Eenhoorn was named the third-team All-American shortstop by Baseball America in 1990 while attending Davidson College in North Carolina. The New York Yankees drafted Eenhoorn in the second round (45th overall) of the 1990 Major League Baseball draft, with a compensation pick obtained for the loss of free agent Walt Terrell to the Pittsburgh Pirates.

Eenhoorn began his professional career with the pennant-winning Class-A Oneonta Yankees in the New York–Penn League and hit .268/.324/.355. He stole 11 bases in 15 tries. He was voted to the League All-Star team as a utility infielder and was labeled a "defensive genius" by Baseball America. He led the league's shortstops in fielding percentage (.960). According to Baseball America, he was the top prospect in the league.

In 1991, Eenhoorn hit .350/.395/.575 for the Gulf Coast League Yankees and .241/.320/.343 for the Class-A Advanced Prince William Cannons. The next season, he batted .305/.370/.409 with the Class-A Advanced Fort Lauderdale Yankees and .235/.271/.327 for the Double-A Albany-Colonie Yankees after entering the season as the #6 prospect in the Yankees system according to Baseball America. He was downgraded to #7 after the year, behind Derek Jeter and ahead of Dave Silvestri among Yankees shortstops.

Eenhoorn batted .280/.324/.433 in 1993 with Albany-Colonie. He was the All-Star shortstop in the Eastern League. He was removed from the top Yankee prospect list after that year. Eenhoorn batted .239/.270/.324 for the Triple-A Columbus Clippers in 1994. He went 2 for 4 in his first three MLB games with the 1994 New York Yankees.

On May 28, 1995, Eenhoorn was the last player to start at shortstop for the New York Yankees before Derek Jeter's debut. Due to Jeter's promotion to Columbus, the Yankees shifted Eenhoorn to second base. He batted .252/.300/.352 that year, and batted 2 for 14 in the majors. In 1996, he hit .337/.406/.448 for the International League champion Clippers, but batted only 1 for 14 in the major leagues.

The Yankees placed Eenhoorn on waivers in September 1996, and he was claimed by the Anaheim Angels. In 1997, he hit .308/.350/.473 for the Triple-A Vancouver Canadians. He was 7 for 20 with the 1997 Anaheim Angels, with his only MLB home run.

Managing career
Back in Rotterdam, Eenhoorn became player-manager of the Hoofdklasse team of Neptunus, during the seasons 1999–2001. All three seasons, Neptunus was most successful on a national level, since it both won in the Hoofdklasse (Dutch Major League) and the Holland Series. He was named Hoofdklasse Most Valuable Player as well as Coach of the Year in 2000, the first person to take both honors in the same year. The team also had international success when it won the World Port Tournament in 1999 and the European Cup in 2000 and 2001. In the 1999 World Port Tournament, Eenhoorn was named co-MVP with Ken Brauckmiller. Eenhoorn also played for the Netherlands national baseball team at the 2000 Sydney Olympics. He was not productive in those Olympics, going 3 for 26 with one walk, no runs and no RBI. He was caught stealing in both of his attempts.

Eenhoorn managed the Netherlands national baseball team between 2001 and 2008, winning four consecutive European Baseball Championships and qualifying for the 2004 and 2008 Olympic Games. When he retired to take up the position of technical director for the Dutch baseball union KNBSB, similar to the position of General manager, succeeded by Rod Delmonico as Dutch coach. Eenhoorn left the national team in sixth place of the IBAF World Rankings.

Eenhoorn then set up the first baseball academy in Europe, the Unicorns academy (Eenhoorn is Dutch for unicorn). The baseball academy model has been duplicated in other European countries and has led to a significant increase in the number of European players signing with MLB clubs.

Personal life
Eenhoorn's son Ryan died at age 6 of a Wilms tumor in 2003; Eenhoorn and his wife Maureen have one surviving son, Ralph.

On November 11, 2011, Eenhoorn was knighted on the order of Queen Beatrix, after he led the Dutch team to the 2011 Baseball World Cup title in his role as technical director. It was the first global baseball tournament won by the Netherlands. Also knighted were manager Brian Farley and catcher Sidney de Jong.

References

External links

1968 births
Albany-Colonie Yankees players
Anaheim Angels players
Baseball player-managers
Baseball players at the 1988 Summer Olympics
Baseball players at the 2000 Summer Olympics
California Angels players
Columbus Clippers players
Davidson Wildcats baseball players
Dutch expatriate baseball players in the United States
Dutch expatriate baseball players in Canada
Directors of football clubs in the Netherlands
Fort Lauderdale Yankees players
Gulf Coast Yankees players
Living people
Major League Baseball infielders
Major League Baseball players from the Netherlands
New York Yankees players
Norfolk Tides players
Olympic baseball players of the Netherlands
Olympic baseball managers
Oneonta Yankees players
Prince William Cannons players
Sportspeople from Rotterdam
Vancouver Canadians players